Marco Belpoliti (born 1954) is an Italian writer, essayist and critic, who contributes regularly to La Repubblica and L'Espresso, and is currently a professor at the University of Bergamo. He is the author of many books and edited the Einaudi edition of the complete works of Primo Levi.

Biography
Marco Belpoliti was born in Reggio Emilia in 1954 and graduated from the University of Bologna in 1978 having completed a thesis on Semiotics supervised by Umberto Eco. His first published work was his novel Confine: vite immaginarie del clown in 1986. He now teaches Sociology of literature and Italian literature at the University of Bergamo. He is co-editor of the literary magazine Riga, which he co-founded in 1991. Since 1998 he has been a regular contributor to La Stampa and, from 2000, has produced a weekly literary review column to L'Espresso. His contributions to La Repubblica began in 2016.

Bibliography
 Confine: vite immaginarie del clown, Elitropia, Reggio Emilia, 1985.
 Giardino pensile, Libreria Vecchia Reggio, Reggio Emilia 1987
 Quanto basta, Rusconi, Milano 1989 
 Storie del visibile. Lettura di Italo Calvino, Luisè, Rimini 1990 ; 
 Stati della geometria con calore, Classezero, Monza 1991
 Diario dell'occhio, Bacacay, Bergamo 1993; Le lettere, Firenze, 2008, ; 
 Italo, Sestante, Ripatransone 1995 
  2006 
 Primo Levi, Bruno Mondadori, Milano 1998 
 
 
 
   - Collana Piccola Biblioteca, Guanda, Parma, 2017, .
 (a cura di, con Gianni Canova e Stefano Chiodi), Annisettanta. Il decennio lungo del secolo breve, Skira, Ginevra-Milano 2007, ; 
 La foto di Moro, Nottetempo, Roma 2008 ; 
 Il tramezzino del dinosauro: 100 oggetti, comportamenti e manie della vita quotidiana, Guanda, Parma-Milano 2008 
 Il corpo del capo, Guanda, Parma-Milano 2009 
 Berlusconi. Le corps du chef, Nouvelles éditions Lignes, Paris 2010 
 Senza vergogna, Guanda, Parma-Milano 2010 
 Pasolini in salsa piccante, con 8 foto di Ugo Mulas, Guanda, Parma-Milano 2010 
 La canottiera di Bossi, Guanda, Parma-Milano 2012 
 Risentimento, (ebook) Guanda, Parma-Milano 2012 
 Visioni, (ebook), doppiozero, Milano 2012 
 Da quella prigione. Moro, Warhol e le Brigate Rosse, Guanda, Parma-Milano 2012 
 Camera Straniera, Johan & Levi, Milano 2012 
 Il segreto di Goya, Johan & Levi, Milano 2013 
 L'età dell'estremismo, Guanda, Milano 2014 
 
 La strategia della farfalla, Guanda, Parma 2015, .

Editor 
 Effetto Emilia, Officina immagine, Bologna, 1981
 Mardi: rien. Existe: (Sartre): Esistenzialismi, Reggio Emilia (mostra a novembre 1981-febbraio 1982), Tecnograf, 1982
 Primo Levi, Opere, 2 voll., Nuova Universale Einaudi 225, Einaudi, Torino, 1997 
 Primo Levi, Conversazioni e interviste 1963-1987, a cura di M. Belpoliti, Einaudi, Torino, 1997 
  trad. Dominique Autrand, Conversations et entretiens, 1963-1987, Laffont, Paris, 2000
 (in English) trad. Robert Gordon, The voice of memory: interviews 1961-1987, New Press, New York, 2001
  trad. Jytte Lollesgaard, Samtaler og interview 1963-1987, Forum, Copenaghen, 2003
 Primo Levi, L'ultimo Natale di guerra, Einaudi, Torino, 2002 
  trad. Nathalie Bauer, 1018, Dernier Noël de guerre Paris, 2002
  trad. Miquel Izquierdo, Ultima Navidad de guerra, El Aleph, Barcelona, 2003
 Primo Levi, L'asimmetria e la vita. Articoli e saggi 1955-1987, Einaudi, Torino, 2002, .
 Primo Levi, Tutti i racconti, Einaudi, Torino, 2005, .
 Giorgio Manganelli, Mammifero italiano, Adelphi, Milano, 2007, .
 Primo Levi, Ist Das Ein Mensch?, Hanser Verlag, München, 2011, 
 Gianni Celati, Romanzi, cronache e racconti, con Nunzia Palmieri, Mondadori, Milano, 2016 
 Primo Levi, Opere Complete (2 voll.), Einaudi, Torino 2016.

References

1954 births
20th-century Italian non-fiction writers
21st-century Italian writers
University of Bologna alumni
Academic staff of the University of Bergamo
Italian critics
Italian essayists
Male essayists
Living people
Italian male non-fiction writers
20th-century Italian male writers